Parliamentary elections were held in Colombia in February 1939 to elect the Chamber of Representatives. The Liberal Party received the most votes.

Results

Chamber of Representatives

Senate

References

Parliamentary elections in Colombia
Colombia
1939 in Colombia
Election and referendum articles with incomplete results